Six Standards (Quintet) 1996 is a live album by pianist/improviser Anthony Braxton with trumpeter Dave Douglas recorded in 1995 at the Knitting Factory and released on the Italian Splasc(H) label in 2004.

Track listing
 "Woody 'n' You" (Dizzy Gillespie) – 11:52
 "Blues and the Abstract Truth" (Oliver Nelson) – 16:25
 "Ruby, My Dear" (Thelonious Monk) – 13:52
 "Like Sonny" (John Coltrane) – 6:54
 "Lazy Bird" (Coltrane) – 11:16
 "Dee's Dilemma" (Mal Waldron) – 11:05

Personnel
 Anthony Braxton – piano 
Dave Douglas – trumpet
Mark Whitecage – alto saxophone, soprano saxophone
Mario Pavone – bass 
Warren Smith – percussion

References

Anthony Braxton live albums
Dave Douglas (trumpeter) live albums
2004 live albums
Albums recorded at the Knitting Factory